Kulasekharapuram  is a village in Kollam district in the state of Kerala, India. It is the largest Grama Panchayath in Karunagappally Legislative Assembly Constituency.Places like Puthiyakavu, Vallickavu, Vavvakkavu, Puthentheruvu are some major places within Kulasekharapuram Village.

Left Democratic Front is now ruling this Grama Panchayath.

Demographics- Census Data 2011

References

 http://www.census2011.co.in/data/town/628364-kulasekharapuram-kerala.html

Villages in Kollam district